Lord Justice James may refer to:

William Milbourne James (judge)
Arthur James (judge)

See also
Justice James (disambiguation)